The German Life Saving Association ( or DLRG) is a relief organization for life saving in Germany. The DLRG is the largest voluntary lifesaving organization in the world.

With around 560,000 members, organised in approximately 2,100 local groups, the DLRG is the largest voluntary water rescue organization in the world. More than one million regular donors support the work of the DLRG.

Tasks
The most urgent goal of the DLRG is the creation and promotion of all activities used to fight drowning. Additional tasks are:

Teach swimming and self-rescue to the public
Educate people about the dangers of swimming and how to avoid them
Teach and train rescue swimming
Basic and advanced training in First Aid
Help and technical safety support for water related activities
Providing lifeguards at public places
Perform rescue related exercises and water sports competitions
Environmental protection at, on and in waters.
Cooperation with German civil defense, especially concerning floods.
International Response Units
International Operations (Lifeguards in Spain are often trained by DLRG members)

Qualifications 
The DLRG trains interested members as qualified technical personnel in the following ranges:

Swimming
First aid / Advanced First aid
Boating
Rescue diver
Swift water rescue
Radio and Communication Systems

History
 
On 28 July 1912, a pier in Binz on the island Rügen, Germany, collapsed under the load of 1,000 people waiting for the cruise steamer Kronprinz Wilhelm. Sailors of the German navy were able to save most people, but 16 people died because they could not swim, including two children. This catastrophe led to the foundation of the "Deutsche Lebens-Rettungs-Gesellschaft (DLRG)" (German lifesaving organization) on 19 October 1913 in Leipzig.

See also
Wasserwacht
Lifeguard
German rescue swimming badge

References

External links
 
 DLRG-Jugend

Swimming in Germany
Lifesaving organizations
Non-profit organisations based in Lower Saxony
1913 establishments in Germany